Central Shelby Historic District is a national historic district located at Shelby, Cleveland County, North Carolina.  It encompasses 229 contributing buildings in the central business district and surrounding residential areas of Shelby.  The district is centered on the Cleveland County Courthouse (1907) and public square, established in 1841.  The district includes representative examples of Colonial Revival and Bungalow / American Craftsman architectural styles.  The district includes the separately listed courthouse, Masonic Temple Building, and Webbley.  Other notable buildings include the Webb House, Wells House, Fulenwider-Ebeltoft House, Dr. S. S. Royster House, Bateman House, Washburn Block, city hall and firehouse (1911), Royster Building (1910), First Baptist Church, Ascension Lutheran Church (1932), and Southern Railway Freight Depot (c. 1920).

It was listed on the National Register of Historic Places in 1983, with a boundary increase in 2002.

Photos

References

Historic districts on the National Register of Historic Places in North Carolina
Colonial Revival architecture in North Carolina
Buildings and structures in Cleveland County, North Carolina
National Register of Historic Places in Cleveland County, North Carolina